1,1,2-Trichloroethane, or 1,1,2-TCA, is an organochloride solvent with the molecular formula CHCl.  It is a colourless, sweet-smelling liquid that does not dissolve in water, but is soluble in most organic solvents. It is an isomer of 1,1,1-trichloroethane.

It is used as a solvent and as an intermediate in the synthesis of 1,1-dichloroethane.

1,1,2-TCA is a central nervous system depressant and inhalation of vapors may cause dizziness, drowsiness, headache, nausea, shortness of breath, and unconsciousness.

Toxicology
Trichloroethane may be harmful by inhalation, ingestion, and skin contact.  It is a respiratory and eye irritant.  Although no definitive studies currently exist, trichloroethane should be treated as a potential carcinogen since laboratory evidence suggests that low molecular weight chlorinated hydrocarbons may be carcinogenic.

The Occupational Safety and Health Administration and National Institute for Occupational Safety and Health have set occupational exposure limits to 1,1,2-Trichloroethane at 10 ppm over an eight-hour time-weighted average. It is considered to be a potential occupational carcinogen.

References

Chloroalkanes
Halogenated solvents
GABAA receptor positive allosteric modulators
Sweet-smelling chemicals